Music Factory (as known as The Music Factory Entertainment Group) is a UK promotional remix service that started in 1985. To this day, the service provides monthly Mastermix albums with exclusive mixes to qualified disc jockeys, as well as having provided a number of spinoff services over the years (some remixed, some not). It is also responsible for the Jive Bunny and the Mastermixers releases that were made commercially available.

History
Although some releases listed were made available commercially, nearly all numbered issues (Mastermix, Euromix, Classic Cuts, Pro DJ, Pro Disc, Pro Dance, Number Ones, MM Professional, Flashback, Remixed, Mashed-Up, Triple Trackers, etc.) as well as all Grandmaster issues are promo only.

References

External links
 
http://www.discogs.com/label/8011-Music-Factory
http://www.mastermixdj.com/about
http://www.musicfactory.co.uk/
https://www.youtube.com/officialmastermixdj

Music promoters
1985 establishments in the United Kingdom
Companies based in Rotherham
Remix services